The Battle of Ameixial, was fought on 8 June 1663, near the village of Santa Vitória do Ameixial, some  north-west of Estremoz, between Spanish and Portuguese as part of the Portuguese Restoration War. In Spain, the battle is better known as the Battle of Estremoz.

In the spring of 1663, the Spanish had undertaken their most successful attack on Portugal, since the beginning of the war.

Under command of John of Austria the Younger, son of Philip IV of Spain (and the conqueror of Catalonia and of the Kingdom of Naples and winner of the French in Italy), the greater part of the south of Portugal was overrun. The important city of Évora was taken on 22 May, opening perspectives for a march on Lisbon,  to the west.

But the lack of ammunition, food and money paralysed the Spanish army. The Portuguese raised a 17,000 men strong army led by Sancho Manoel de Vilhena, aided by Frederick Schomberg, 1st Duke of Schomberg, Fernando de Meneses, Count of Ericeira and other senior officers, and marched against the Spanish. The Spanish commander decided to retreat to a strategic position at the north east of Évora and wait for the enemy, leaving a garrison of 3,700 in Évora.

The Portuguese army was reinforced by three regiments (1 cavalry & 2 infantry) of about 3,000 troops, from England (mostly from around the British isles) which were put under the command of the Duke of Schomberg. Also included were a small number of mercenaries from France. Of this foreign contingent, almost 2,000 English fought in Ameixial, about 1600 incorporated in the infantry and 300 in the cavalry.

The standard of Don John of Austria  was captured when his squadron was almost totally killed. The standard was later presented to King Afonso VI of Portugal himself.

The Spanish casualties were very high, all of their artillery and baggage was captured, and the army was forced to retreat to Badajoz in Extremadura. When the Spanish garrison of Évora of 3,700 men capitulated on 24 June 1663, the whole expedition was a complete failure. The independence of the Kingdom of Portugal was saved while the military career of John of Austria ended.

A memorial stone was placed on the site of the battlefield.

The battle is memorialized in a prominent azulejo of the Room of the Battles in the Palace of the Marquises of Fronteira, created in 1671-1672.

See also
 English Expedition to Portugal (1662-1668)

References

Bibliography 
 
 
 
 
 

Ameixial
Ameixial
1663 in Portugal
Conflicts in 1663
Ameixial
Estremoz